The following lists events that happened during 1980 in Zimbabwe.

Incumbents

 President: Canaan Banana (starting 18 April)
 Prime Minister: Robert Mugabe (starting 18 April)

Events

April 18 - Zimbabwe's independence from the United Kingdom is recognised internationally, and the country becomes a republic in the Commonwealth of Nations - which remains the case until December 2003, when Zimbabwe left the Commonwealth of Nations.
April 18 - Canaan Banana, a Methodist minister and theologian, becomes the first President of Zimbabwe. Robert Mugabe becomes the first Prime Minister of Zimbabwe.
 July 31 - The Zimbabwean field hockey team wins the gold medal in the 1980 Summer Olympics celebrated in Moscow (USSR) (see also Zimbabwe at the 1980 Summer Olympics and Field hockey at the 1980 Summer Olympics).
August 25 - Zimbabwe joins the United Nations.
November 8 - Enos Nkala makes remarks at a rally in Bulawayo, in which he warns ZAPU that ZANU would deliver a few blows against them. This starts the first Entumbane uprising, in which Zimbabwe People's Revolutionary Army and Zimbabwe African National Liberation Army fight for two days.

Deaths

This section lists deaths in Zimbabwe during 1980.

References

 
Zimbabwe
1980s in Zimbabwe
Years of the 20th century in Zimbabwe
Zimbabwe